The 1985 Utah Utes football team represented the University of Utah as a member of the Western Athletic Conference (WAC) during the 1985 NCAA Division I-A football season. In their first season under head coach Jim Fassel, the Utes compiled an overall record of 8–4 with a mark of 5–3 in conference play, finished third in the WAC, and outscored their opponents 405 to 343. Home games were played on campus at Robert Rice Stadium in Salt Lake City.

Utah's statistical leaders included Larry Egger with 2,988 passing yards, Eddie Johnson with 1,018 rushing yards, and Loren Richey with 971 receiving yards.

Schedule

Coaching staff
 Jim Fassel, head coach
 Jack Reilly, offensive coordinator quarterbacks coach
 George Wheeler, defensive coordinator, defensive line coach
 Sean McNabb, tight ends coach, special teams coach
 Mark Pierce, defensive ends coach
 Fred Graves, wide receivers coach
 Ron McBride, offensive line coach
 Wayne McQuivey, offensive backs coach
 Dave Kotulski, inside linebackers coach
 Mike Gillhamer, defensive backs coach
 Larry Wilson, assistant defensive line coach

NFL Draft
Two Utah players were selected in the 1986 NFL Draft, which went 12 rounds with 333 selections.

References

External links
 University of Utah Libraries – 1985 Utes football media guide
 WSU Libraries: Game television broadcast – Washington State at Utah – September 21, 1985

Utah
Utah Utes football seasons
Utah Utes football